Malo Lešče is a settlement in the Municipality of Metlika in the White Carniola area of southeastern Slovenia, right on the border with Croatia. It is included in the traditional region of Lower Carniola and is now part of the Southeast Slovenia Statistical Region.

References

External links

Malo Lešče on Geopedia

Populated places in the Municipality of Metlika